The Good News Club: The Christian Right's Stealth Assault on America's Children is a book by American journalist Katherine Stewart about the Good News Club (GNC). Published through PublicAffairs in 2012, the book examines the GNC, its parent organization Child Evangelism Fellowship (CEF), and the effects of Good News Clubs on schools and surrounding communities since the U.S. Supreme Court ruled that public schools could not exclude them in a lawsuit involving GNC. Reviewers praised the research of the book while stating her writing at times could be hyperbolic and calling the book advocacy journalism. John E. Tropman of the University of Michigan's School of Social Work suggested the book as a part of sociology of religion courses.

Author and background
The author of the book is Katherine Stewart, an American journalist and novelist who wrote for Rolling Stone, The New York Times, and The Village Voice at the time of the book's publication. When a GNC formed at the public elementary school her daughter attended, she investigated the club, which led to the beginning of the book. Three years prior to the book's publication, Stewart published an article in the alternative newspaper Santa Barbara Independent which contained text identical to that in the book. At the time of the book's publication, she published an article in The Guardian in which she compared CEF's teaching of 1 Samuel (15:3), in which God commands Saul to destroy the Amalekites, to teaching genocide to schoolchildren. CEF responded that "[t]he goal of [CEF] is the proper teaching of this passage, which is not an instruction in genocide".

Overview

The book examines the Good News Club (GNC), an after-school program which primarily targets students between the ages of four to fourteen in elementary schools in the United States. This cohort of students is called the "4/14 window". In the Ballard neighborhood of Seattle, a GNC forms at Loyal Heights Elementary School, led by a volunteer school aid and members of an evangelical church. As the GNC takes hold at Loyal Heights, parents worry that their children are being proselytized, and students and minorities at other schools at which GNC operates feel ostracized by the students in the club trying to convert other children.

Stewart attends the triennial Child Evangelism Fellowship (CEF) conference, where speakers mention that GNCs grew from 16,805 children in 2001 to 139,221 in 2009, a 728 percent growth. CEF is the parent organization of GNC. At the conference, she learns of "The Plan", a guidebook on how to open a GNC given to volunteers. Volunteers must raise approximately $20,000 a year to open and maintain a GNC. In his keynote address, Mathew Staver, founder of the Liberty Counsel, states "if you want to change ... the planet, you want to focus on those children ages five through twelve".

In chapter three, the author examines the history of religion in public schools and touches on historical events such as the Eliot School rebellion and the Scopes trial. In chapter four, she examines organizations such as the American Center for Law & Justice, legal cases such as Good News Club v. Milford Central School, and conservative Supreme Court of the United States Justices including Antonin Scalia and Clarence Thomas. Moving to Manhattan in New York City, the author uses her experiences of viewing a school rented by a church for use during after-school hours as a jumping board to view "planted" churches, in which the churches "operate independently, [but] typically maintain ties to an existing religious organization or network" and use schools after-hours for religious purposes. 

Stewart attends Mission Fest Seattle, where presenters explain how to instruct children on sin and Jesus, with an overarching theme on the 4/14 window. Traveling to Texas in chapter seven, Stewart observes hearings of the State Board of Education (BoE) in which textbook policy for older children is announced. The BoE set textbook standards for not only Texas but the nation, as textbook publishers do not want to publish state-specific versions thereof and Texas was the "largest single market" for textbooks as of the writing of the book. The author details the National Council on Bible Curriculum in Public Schools in Odessa, Texas, and how local residents sued the school district to prevent its course from being taught in chapter eight. The lawsuit ended in mediation in which the course changed to a more secular bible studies course.

In chapter nine, Stewart focuses on Christian organizations in public high schools such as Success for Kids, an in-school program led by the Kabbalah Centre. In the same chapter, she focuses on sex education in public high schools, Christian views of human sexuality, and groups such as True Love Waits, who promote chastity among youth.

Critical reception

Reviewers of the book praised its research, while calling its language occasionally hyperbolic and more of a "call to action than to contemplation". Reviewing the book for the Minneapolis Star Tribune, freelance writer Alexander Heffner summarized Stewart's work as suggesting fundamentalist Christianity gained an "undue influence" in education, itself characterized as nonreligious. Heffner called Stewart a gracious narrator respectful of the persons she interviewed for the book, and the book "an important work that reveals a movement little discussed in the mainstream media". Kirkus Reviews called it "compelling investigative journalism about an undercovered phenomenon" though it also described the book as the strongest form of advocacy journalism. Publishers Weekly called Stewart's research "thoughtful" but her writing at times "hyperbolic". 

Howard B. Radest gave the book a positive review in The Humanist, praising in particular her writing style; Jeff Trotter described Stewart's writing style as easy in the Journal of Education and Christian Belief. Trotter summarized the book as painting an intriguing image of a Christian agenda, though failing to distinguish between individuals' goals locally and the goals of the national organization. He praised the book's research, and said given the combativeness and hyperbole in America around public education, it would be easy to dismiss the book as exactly that, though to do so would be mistaken.

In The Journal of Sociology & Social Welfare, John E. Tropman of the University of Michigan's School of Social Work examines the book in the context of "values imperialism" and states evangelical Christians may pursue such as outward indicators of inward grace, based on the assumption God would not let a saved person fail. Tropman then suggests the book useful in sociology of religion courses, and calls the book more of a "call to action than to contemplation". Writing for The Women's Review of Books, assistant director for the Center for Research on Women and Gender at the University of Illinois Chicago Veronica I. Arreola called Stewart's identification of whitewashing at a Texas school district astonishing and precise. Arreola went on to say that the book was not one that opposed Christianity or religion, but one that examined how GNCs waste public educational funding and try to upend the separation of church and state in the United States in public schools. David Austin Walsh of The Baffler described Stewart's 2020 book The Power Worshippers: Inside the Dangerous Rise of Religious Nationalism as a sequel to The Good News Club.

See also
 Separation of church and state

Notes

References

2012 non-fiction books
Separation_of_church_and_state
PublicAffairs books